John Carew (3 July 1622 - 15 October 1660) was a member of the landed gentry from Antony, Cornwall and MP for Tregony from 1647 to 1653. A prominent supporter of the Fifth Monarchists, a millenarianist religious sect, he backed Parliament and the Commonwealth in the Wars of the Three Kingdoms and approved the Execution of Charles I in January 1649. He held various administrative positions during the Interregnum, including membership of the English Council of State, but was deprived of office and jailed in 1655 for his opposition to The Protectorate. 

Although aware that as a regicide of Charles I he was likely to be arrested after the 1660 Stuart Restoration, Carew made no attempt to escape. During the trial, he claimed that by signing Charles' death warrant, he was simply complying with a legal Act of Parliament, an argument rejected by the court.

He was found guilty of treason and hanged, drawn and quartered on 15 October 1660, two days after his close friend Thomas Harrison suffered the same fate.

Personal details
John Carew was born 3 July 1622 in Antony, Cornwall, the eldest child of Sir Richard Carew, 1st Baronet (c. 1580–1643), and Grace Rolle (1606–1655), his second wife. He had three full brothers, including Thomas (1624–1681), plus five siblings from his father's first marriage, among them Elizabeth (1605–1679), and Alexander (1608–1644). The latter fought for Parliament in the early stages of the First English Civil War, but was executed in December 1644 after attempting to hand over Drake's Island to the Royalists.

He does not appear to have married or produced children; his estate of Boxhill Manor, now part of the city of Exeter, was confiscated after his death, then returned to his brother Thomas in 1662.

Career    

Carew entered Gloucester College, Oxford in March 1638, and began legal training at the Inner Temple in November 1639, although there is no record of him graduating from either. When the First English Civil War began in August 1642, the Carew family were among the few members of the Cornish gentry who supported Parliament. As a result, he served on a number of Parliamentary committees for Cornwall, although it was held by the Royalists until their forces in the West Country surrendered on 12 March 1646.       

Elected MP for Tregony in 1647, Carew also belonged to the Fifth Monarchists, a Protestant millenarianist group who viewed the execution of Charles I in January 1649 as paving the way for the second coming of Christ. This belief was one reason he became a regicide, as did other members of the sect, including Thomas Harrison, William Goffe, and John Jones Maesygarnedd.

   
Like many of the other 59 men who signed the death warrant for Charles I, he was in grave danger when Charles II of England was restored to the throne. 
Some of the 59 fled England but Carew was arrested, put on trial, and found guilty. 
He was hanged, drawn and quartered on 15 October 1660.

Trial
Mr John Carew as tried on 12 Oct. 1660.

Execution
According to Edmund Ludlow,

See also

 Sir Alexander Carew, 2nd Baronet, his brother.
 List of regicides of Charles I
 Long Parliament

References

Sources
 
 
 
 

The Memoirs of Edmund Ludlow, Lieutenant-General of the Horse, in the Army of the Commonwealth of England, 1625-1672, Edited with Appendices of Letters and Illustrative Documents, by C.H. Firth, M.A., in two volumes, Oxford, At the Clarendon Press, 1894

Further reading
 David Plant,  John Carew,  Regicide, 1622–60, British Civil Wars and Commonwealth website. Accessed 2 December 2022.

1622 births
1660 deaths
Alumni of Gloucester College, Oxford
Executed regicides of Charles I
Fifth Monarchists
People executed by Stuart England by hanging, drawing and quartering
People from Antony, Cornwall
Members of the Inner Temple
Members of the pre-1707 English Parliament for constituencies in Cornwall
Members of the Parliament of England (pre-1707) for Devon
Younger sons of baronets